Goldasht (formerly, Qaleh Shah, also Romanized as Qal‘eh Shāh, Qal‘eh-ye Shāh, and Ghalehshah meaning "Castle of the King", after the Iranian Revolution, the name was changed to Shahrak-i Imam, meaning "City of the Imam" in honor of Ayatollah Khomeini) is a city in the Central District of Najafabad County, Isfahan Province, Iran.  At the 2006 census, its population was 22,693, in 5,830 families.

References

Populated places in Najafabad County

Cities in Isfahan Province